Glenn Firebaugh is an American sociologist (born: Charleston, West Virginia) and leading international authority on social science research methods. Currently he is the Roy C. Buck Distinguished Professor of Sociology (Emeritus) at the Pennsylvania State University. He has also held regular or visiting faculty appointments at Harvard University, Vanderbilt University, Oxford University, and the University of Michigan.
Firebaugh is best known for his contributions to statistical methods and for his research on global inequality. In 2018 he received the Paul F. Lazarsfeld Award from the American Sociological Association for "a career of distinguished contributions to the field of sociological methodology." His publications are highly cited by other social scientists.

Career and education

Glenn Firebaugh attended graduate school at Indiana University at Bloomington where he received his M.A. in 1974 and Ph.D in 1976, both in sociology with a minor in econometrics, and mathematical models. He then joined Vanderbilt University in 1976 as an Assistant Professor, and then advanced to Associate Professor in 1982. He joined Pennsylvania State as a Full Professor in 1988 and was the head of the Department of Sociology from 2001-2004. He advanced to Distinguished Professor in 2006.

From 1995-1996 Firebaugh was deputy editor and 1997 to 1999 he was the editor of the American Sociological Review.

Major contributions

Rules for Social Research 

Firebaugh summarizes the principles for good research in his book Seven Rules for Social Research.  The first rule is that "There should be the possibility of surprise in social research." Good research also will "look for differences that make a difference" (Rule 2) and "build in reality checks" (Rule 3).  Rule 4 advises researchers to replicate, that is, "to see if identical analyses yield similar results for different samples of people" (p. 90). The next two rules urge researchers to "compare like with like" (Rule 5) and to "study change" (Rule 6); these two rules are especially important when researchers want to estimate the effect of one variable on another. The final rule, "Let method be the servant, not the master," reminds researchers that methods are the means, not the end, of social research; it is critical from the outset to fit the research design to the research issue, rather than the other way around.

Firebaugh's general equation for inequality indices
Inequality indices are scalar measures designed to quantify the degree of inequality in distributions of some valued good, such as income. Researchers often use inequality indices to compare the degree of inequality across populations (for example, to determine if there is greater income inequality in California than in Texas, or in Brazil versus South Africa).  The best-known inequality index is the Gini coefficient; others include the Atkinson measure, the Theil index, the Hoover index (a.k.a. Robin Hood index), and many others.

Firebaugh has shown that standard inequality indices reduce to a convenient common form.  He begins by noting that perfect equality exists when the inequality ratio, rj = Xj /   equals 1.0 for all j units in some population (for example, there is perfect income inequality when everyone’s income Xj equals the mean income , so that rj = 1.0 for everyone).  Inequality, then, refers to deviations of the rj from 1.0; the greater the average deviation, the greater the inequality. Inequality indices reflect that fact because they have this common form:

Inequality Index = 

where pj weights the units by their population share (necessary in a cross-country analysis, for example, since countries vary in population), and f(rj) is a function of the deviation of each unit’s rj from 1.0, the point of equality. The important insight of Firebaugh’s general inequality equation is that inequality indices differ because they employ different functions of the distance of the inequality ratios (the rj) from 1.0.

Trends in global income inequality
Firebaugh was among the first to note that income inequality for the world as a whole leveled off in the last decades of the 20th century, after rising for more than two centuries. Firebaugh describes this important turning point in a 1999 lead article in the American Journal of Sociology  and in a 2003 book.   While global income inequality is massive, it has remained relatively steady or declined somewhat in recent years due to rapid income growth in China and India. Firebaugh’s findings challenged earlier claims that global income inequality continues to rise rapidly. According to Firebaugh, that claim was based on a flaw: Each country was assigned equal weighting, despite vast differences in population size. When populous countries such as China and India are given their due weight, the data show that global income inequality has not been rising sharply, and most likely is not rising at all. Firebaugh’s findings have been verified by others. As a result, earlier claims by the United Nations and the World Bank of rapidly rising global income inequality have been modified in their more recent publications.

Avoiding the ecological fallacy
Researchers are said to commit the ecological fallacy when they make untested inferences about individual-level relationships from aggregate data. It is called a fallacy because it is based on the problematic assumption that relationships at one level of aggregation also hold at another level of aggregation. To illustrate, consider the fact that George Wallace, a four-term governor of Alabama and well-known segregationist who ran as a third-party candidate well in the 1968 US Presidential election, received a higher share of votes in regions with higher percentages of blacks.  From this one might erroneously conclude that blacks were disproportionately inclined to vote for Wallace (post-election surveys showed that, while one in eight whites voted for Wallace, virtually no blacks did).
Firebaugh has contributed to this literature by delineating theoretical conditions or rules under which it is possible to infer individual-level relationships from aggregate data. These conditions are important because researchers are subject to the ecological fallacy in virtually all the social and behavioral sciences - from history to political science to epidemiology – since individual-level data often are unavailable.

Decomposing social change

Books

Prizes and awards
Taiwan National Science Council Distinguished Lecturer, Academia Sinica, Taipei, 2005
Faculty Scholar Medal for Outstanding Achievement in the Social and Behavioral Sciences, Pennsylvania State University, 2001
Best-Article Prize, Center for the Study of Inequality, Cornell University, 2001, for “Empirics of World Income Inequality” (American Journal of Sociology, May 1999)
Lecturer, Zentrum fur Umfragen, Methoden und Analysen, Mannheim, Germany, 2000
Distinction in the Social Sciences Award, College of the Liberal Arts, Pennsylvania State University, 2000
Member, Sociological Research Association
NIMH Fellow in Quantitative Methods, Indiana University, Bloomington, IN

References

External links
 Firebaugh's web page.

Living people
American sociologists
Pennsylvania State University faculty
People from Charleston, West Virginia
Scientists from West Virginia
University of Michigan faculty
Year of birth missing (living people)
American Sociological Review editors